Andrés Luciano Lilini (born August 13, 1974 in Santa Fe de la Vera Cruz) is an Argentine former professional footballer and current manager of Necaxa.

Career

Early career 
Lillini had a brief career as a footballer, which ended at the age of 25 after playing in Newell's Old Boys.

After retiring as a footballer, he began a career in the footballer development structures of various soccer clubs around the world. Between 2001 and 2006 he served as director of youth development at Mexican club Monarcas Morelia. Later, in 2007, Lillini began working at Boca Juniors, where he remained  until 2011. Between 2011 and 2014 he continued his career in Europe with PFC CSKA Moscow.

In 2015, Lillini began working as a technical assistant in the Chilean team San Luis de Quillota, accompanying Mario Sciacqua. The following year he continued on Sciacqua's coaching staff, but this time working for Gimnasia y Esgrima de Jujuy.

Universidad Nacional 
On November 24, 2017, Lillini returned to Mexico and was appointed director of the academy and reserve teams of the Club Universidad Nacional.

Due to his knowledge of the club's academy, Lillini was appointed as interim manager of the UNAM first team on July 23, 2020, replacing Míchel, who resigned the day before. Due to the good results shown and the youth soccer development policy, on August 17, he was ratified as manager for the rest of the Torneo Guardianes 2020. On 13 December 2020 Lillini achieved the runner-up for UNAM, the team was defeated in the final by Club León,  however, due to this result, Lillini managed to continue as manager for the Guardianes 2021.

Managerial statistics

References

External links
 
 

1974 births
Living people
Liga MX managers
Argentine footballers
Argentine expatriate sportspeople in Mexico
Argentine football managers
Club Universidad Nacional managers
Newell's Old Boys footballers
Association footballers not categorized by position
Footballers from Santa Fe, Argentina